Allerwash railway station served the hamlet of Allerwash, Northumberland, England from 1836 to 1837 on the Newcastle and Carlisle Railway.

History 
The station opened on 28 June 1836 by the Newcastle and Carlisle Railway. It was a short-lived station that was only open for 7 months, closing in early January 1837.

References

External links 

Disused railway stations in Northumberland
Railway stations in Great Britain closed in 1837
1836 establishments in England
1837 disestablishments in England

Railway stations in Great Britain opened in 1836